A board of nursing is a regulatory body that oversees the practice of nursing within a defined jurisdiction, typically a state or province.  The board typically approves and oversees schools of nursing within its jurisdiction.  The board also handles all aspects of nurse licensure with its jurisdiction.  In the US, state and territorial boards of nursing comprise the National Council of State Boards of Nursing.

References

Nursing regulation